The 2013 Yakima Regional Hospital Challenger was a professional tennis tournament played on outdoor hard courts. It was the second edition of the tournament which was part of the 2013 ITF Women's Circuit, offering a total of $50,000 in prize money. It took place in Yakima, Washington, United States, on July 8–14, 2013.

WTA entrants

Seeds 

 1 Rankings as of June 24, 2013

Other entrants 
The following players received wildcards into the singles main draw:
  Robin Anderson
  Jacqueline Cako
  Lauren Embree
  Mary Weatherholt

The following players received entry from the qualifying draw:
  Julia Boserup
  Asia Muhammad
  Alexandra Stevenson
  Ashley Weinhold

The following players received entry by a Protected Ranking:
  Ivana Lisjak

Champions

Women's singles 

  Nicole Gibbs def.  Ivana Lisjak 6–1, 6–4

Women's doubles 

  Jan Abaza /  Allie Will def.  Naomi Broady /  Irina Falconi 7–5, 3–6, [10–3]

External links 
 
 2013 Yakima Regional Hospital Challenger at ITFtennis.com

2013 ITF Women's Circuit
Hard court tennis tournaments